C. cinnabarina may refer to:

 Calonectria cinnabarina, an ascomycete fungus
 Caloplaca cinnabarina, an Australian lichen
 Calostoma cinnabarina, a gasteroid fungus
 Canna cinnabarina, a garden plant
 Cattleya cinnabarina, a New World orchid
 Compsothespis cinnabarina, a praying mantis
 Crocosmia cinnabarina, a flowering plant
 Cryptachaea cinnabarina, a Brazilian spider
 Cystodermella cinnabarina, a basidiomycete fungus